Salempur Rajputana is a census town in the Roorkee Municipal Corporation of Roorkee in Haridwar district of the Indian state of Uttarakhand. It is a area in Roorkee, Ramnagar. Salempur Rajputana is famous for its ameliorative, productive and progressive industrial area. This is a town with Hindu majority most people here are of Gaddadiya, Daharia and Rada gotra and are part of Saini community.

History

Ancient History 
Salempur Rajputana was a city that was a part of Mayapuri (Present, Haridwar) that was kingdom of Daksh, who was son of lord brahma. Ancient name of Salempur was Varadnagri which means a city which provides boons or fulfills wishes of its citizens and visitors. Varad is also a name of Lord Shiva and Lord Ganesha. Varadnagri was slowly and gradually renamed to Shyampur. Sati (Parvati) was daughter of Daksh, who was married to Lord Shiva in this context Varadnagri was also in laws house of Lord Shiva. At some distance from Varadnagri Sati kund can be seen were Sati laid down her life. Goddess Sati came for excursion  in the gardens of Varadnagri.

Medieval History

Hindu period 

Shyampur (presently, Salempur) was renamed to Shyampur Rajputana by Rajput rulers. Development was carried out in this area and also a  temple of Lord Shiva was constructed, which is in present time known as Pracheen Shiv Mandir, however in year 2020 this temple has been reconstructed.

Mughal Period  

Shyampur Rajputana was destroyed, set to fire and devastated and many citizens were killed and this city was deserted and renamed this place to Salempur by mughal emperors.

Modern History

Before Independence 

Salempur was village of Saharanpur district before Haridwar district came into existence on 28 December 1988. Salempur was resettled by Khushi Saini in year 1891. His brother was Amar Singh. Son of Khushi Saini was Fakira Saini, who was a farmer. Then Fakira had two sons Janki Saini and Ruhla Saini, who were also known as Neem wala.

After Independence  

First elections were carried out in year 1992 after 73rd amendment in Constitution. Until 2016 Salempur Rajputana was a village near Roorkee city but in 2016 Salempur became a town and a part of the Roorkee Municipal Corporation and Jhabrera Municipal council.

Facilities

Shrines

Pracheen Shiv Mandir
An ancient temple of Lord shiva was constructed here by Hindu rulers. This is presently known as Pracheen Shiv Mandir. From year 2020 to 2021 this temple was reconstructed. The reconstruction was done possible by the assistance and support of people of Salempur Rajputana. The inauguration and the installation of idols of Lord Shiva, Goddess Parvati, Lord Ganesh, Lord Karthikeya Shiv ling, and Nandi was done on 18 February 2021.

Bhumiya Kheda

Bhumiya is the main God of Salempur Rajputana. Bhumiya kheda is the temple of Lord Bhumiya. In addition to people of this village, people of Premnagar, Krishnanagar, and other areas near salempur also worship Lord Bhumiya as a God and savior.

Demography

Population

According to the 2011 census, the total population of Salempur Rajputana was 10340 from which 4827 were female and 5513 are male. There were 1310 children under age of 6 out of which 707 were male and 603 were female.

Religions

Of total population, 97.14 are Hindus, 2.1% are Muslims, and 0.77% are of other religions.

Literacy

Total literacy rate of Salempur Rajputana is 90.29%, here 83.93% of females, and 95.88% of males are educated.

Notes

References

Cities and towns in Haridwar district
Roorkee